The 1969–70 Plunket Shield season was a tournament of the Plunket Shield, the domestic first-class cricket competition of New Zealand.

Otago won the championship, finishing at the top of the points table at the end of the round-robin tournament between the six first-class sides, Auckland, Canterbury, Central Districts, Northern Districts, Otago and Wellington. Ten points were awarded for a win, five points for having a first innings lead in a draw and one point for a first innings deficit in a draw. The match between Otago and Northern Districts was rained off before both teams could complete one innings each resulting in both teams gaining three competition points.

Table
Below are the Plunket Shield standings for the season:

References

Plunket Shield
Plunket Shield